Todd Michael "Leon" Bridges (born July 13, 1989) is an American soul singer, songwriter and record producer. He is best known for his 2015 song "Coming Home", which received regular airplay and was also a Top 10 Most Viral Track on Spotify. Bridges' debut album, also titled Coming Home, was released on June 23, 2015, on Columbia Records and subsequently nominated for Best R&B Album at the 58th Annual Grammy Awards.

Early life
Todd Michael Bridges was born in Atlanta, Georgia on July 13, 1989, but raised in Fort Worth, Texas.

Bridges learned to play the guitar by playing simple chords to accompany his lyrics. While working at Del Frisco's Grille in Fort Worth, he played countless open-mics until he was signed by Columbia Records in December 2014. It was his song "Lisa Sawyer", about his mother's conversion, that first defined his style.

Career

2014–2015: Coming Home

Bridges began writing and performing 1950s and '60s-style soul music that was described by Austin 360 as "a transmission straight from the heart." He began to attract followers, and his break into the music industry has been attributed to meeting guitarist Austin Jenkins and Joshua Block of White Denim. It was Bridges' performance of "Coming Home" that caught the attention of the two. Bridges worked on his first few tracks with Jenkins and Block as producers. They recorded an album with vintage equipment, using local musicians affiliated with White Denim. Bridges released two demo songs on Soundcloud in late 2014. "Coming Home" received airplay from local radio stations including KKXT. It attracted the attention from several record labels with Bridges eventually signing with Columbia Records in December 2014.

Bridges began his first national tour in January 2015, playing shows in Texas as well as playing support for Sharon Van Etten in New York City. His first official single, "Coming Home", was released on Columbia Records in February 2015. The song continued the success of the demo version and became a Top 10 Most Viral Track on Spotify the same month as its release. Bridges toured with Jenkins and Block until they resumed work with White Denim. He also played at the Sundance Film Festival and played at the SXSW festival in 2015.

His debut album was released in the summer of 2015 and has been referred to as a 2015 "Album to Look Forward to From Texans" by The New York Times. Bridges made the cover of Fort Worth, Texas magazine in May 2015 for his vocal accomplishments and his distinctive retro style. "Coming Home" is featured in an Apple iPhone 6 commercial. Bridges made his first appearance in the UK as an artist in May when he sold out the London Village Underground. He went on to announce four July dates, ending with a gig at Shepherd's Bush Empire on September 28. Coming Home was nominated for Best R&B Album at the 58th Annual Grammy Awards.

Aside from his own shows, Bridges also supported Pharrell Williams at the Apple Music Festival on September 26. While opening at the intimate Roundhouse, he was able to perform songs such as "River", "Better Man" and "Lisa Sawyer" from his debut album Coming Home. Bridges was the featured musical guest on Saturday Night Live on December 5, 2015. He performed "Smooth Sailin'" with a full backup band and sang "River" with only backup singers and organ, accompanying himself on guitar.

2016–2019: Good Thing and Texas Sun 

Bridges also participated in Macklemore & Ryan Lewis's song "Kevin", which was released on the duo's second full-length album.

On February 24, 2016, Bridges performed in Washington, D.C., as part of the series "In Performance at the White House" for President and Michelle Obama. He performed a song by Ray Charles as well as one of his own songs.

On April 8, 2016, Bridges was the live artist featured on BBC Radio London Robert Elms show. Elms interviewed Bridges briefly, and played track 8, "Pull Away", from the Coming Home album. Bridges was set up to play live with Colin O'Brien. Together they performed a live version of "River". The live track was so well received it was played again as "live track of the week" on the Elms Saturday show on April 9, and again on April 11 during a program segment on the best-ever live performances on the Robert Elms show.

In 2017 "River" received further recognition in the first season of the HBO series Big Little Lies. It was later included on the soundtrack for the show.

In 2018, his song "Better Man" was featured in the film Pacific Rim: Uprising. He was the opening act on the South American and Mexican legs of Harry Styles' first solo tour. Bridges' second album Good Thing was released on May 4, 2018. He had a cameo appearance in Damien Chazelle's film First Man, playing singer Gil Scott-Heron. Bridges and Gary Clark Jr. appeared together on the song "Gone Away" from rapper Bun B's album Return of the Trill, with Bridges singing the hook and Clark on lead guitar. On May 18, Bridges performed "Beyond" from the album Good Thing on an episode of the BBC series The Graham Norton Show.

In December 2019, Houston, Texas-based trio Khruangbin announced a collaboration and tour with Leon Bridges and released a single titled "Texas Sun" on December 6, 2019. The collaborative EP of the same name was released in February 2020.

2020–present: Gold-Diggers Sound

On June 8, 2020, Bridges and Terrace Martin released a single titled "Sweeter" in response to the murder of George Floyd on May 25.

Bridges performed at the 2020 Democratic National Convention.

Bridges' third studio album, Gold-Diggers Sound, was released on July 23, 2021.

A second collaborative EP with Khruangbin, titled Texas Moon, was released on February 18, 2022.

Musical style

Artistry
Bridges's style is primarily soul, but resembling 1960s rhythm and blues. The Wall Street Journal described him as a "throwback to '60s-soul a la Otis Redding and Sam Cooke." Bridges performs in vintage clothing; Fort Worth Weekly described him as someone whose "music sounds like he looks."

Discography

Albums

Extended plays

Singles

As lead artist

As featured artist

Other charted songs

Guest appearances

Music videos

Awards and nominations

Grammy Awards

|-
|2016
|Coming Home
|Best R&B Album
|
|-
|2017
|"River"
|Best Music Video
|
|-
|rowspan="2"|2019
|Good Thing
|Best R&B Album
|
|-
|"Bet Ain't Worth the Hand"
|Best Traditional R&B Performance
|
|-
|}

See also
 List of Columbia Records artists
 Music of Texas

References

Notes

Sources

External links

 
 

1989 births
Living people
People from Fort Worth, Texas
Columbia Records artists
African-American male singer-songwriters
African-American guitarists
Grammy Award winners
Guitarists from Texas
21st-century American guitarists
21st-century African-American male singers
20th-century African-American male singers
Singer-songwriters from Texas